Harkujärve is a village in Harku Parish, Harju County in northern Estonia. It has a population of 766 (as of 1 December 2019). The village is located on the western and southwestern side of Lake Harku.

References

Villages in Harju County